Joanna Seybert (born September 18, 1946) is a senior United States district judge of the United States District Court for the Eastern District of New York.

Education and career

Seybert received a Bachelor of Arts degree from the University of Cincinnati in 1967 and a Juris Doctor from St. John's University School of Law in 1971. She began her legal career as a trial attorney for the Legal Aid Society in New York City from 1971 to 1973. She served as a senior trial attorney for the Federal Defender Services of the Legal Aid Society in Brooklyn, New York from 1973 to 1975. She was an attorney in private practice in Woodbury, New York in 1976 and 1979. She was a senior staff attorney for the Legal Aid Society in Nassau County, New York from 1976 to 1979. She served as Chief of the Major Litigation Bureau in Nassau County Attorney's Office from 1980 to 1987. She was a Judge of the Nassau County District Court from 1987 to 1991 and a Judge of the Nassau County Court from 1992 to 1993.

Federal judicial service

She was nominated to the United States District Court for the Eastern District of New York by President Bill Clinton on September 24, 1993, to a new seat created by 104 Stat. 5089, confirmed by the United States Senate on November 20, 1993, and received her commission on November 24, 1993. She assumed senior status on January 13, 2014.

External links

1946 births
Living people
University of Cincinnati alumni
St. John's University School of Law alumni
Judges of the United States District Court for the Eastern District of New York
United States district court judges appointed by George H. W. Bush
20th-century American judges
Lawyers from Brooklyn
New York (state) state court judges
21st-century American judges
20th-century American women judges
21st-century American women judges